Screen time is the amount of time spent using a device with a screen such as a smartphone, computer, television, or video game console. The concept is under significant research with related concepts in digital media use and mental health. Screen time is correlated with mental and physical harm in child development. The positive or negative health effects of screen time are influenced by levels and content of exposure. To prevent harmful exposure to screen time, some governments have placed regulations on its usage.

History

Statistics 
The first electronic screen was the cathode ray tube (CRT), which was invented in 1897 and commercialized in 1922. CRT's were the most popular choice for display screens until the rise of liquid crystal displays (LCDs) in the early 2000s. Screens are now an essential part of entertainment, advertising, and information technologies.

Since their popularization in 2007, smartphones have become ubiquitous in daily life. In 2019, 81% of American adults reported owning a smartphone, up from 64% in 2015. An American survey in 2016 found a median of 3.7 minutes per hour of screen time over a 30-day period.

All forms of screens are frequently used by children and teens. Nationally representative data of children and teens in the United States show that the daily average of screen time increases with age. TV and video games were once largest contributors to children's screen time, but the past decade has seen a shift towards smart phones and tablets. Specifically, a 2011 nationally representative survey of American parents of children from birth to age 8 suggests that TV accounted for 51% of children's total daily screen time, while mobile devices only accounted for 4%. However, in 2017, TV dropped down to 42% of children's total daily screen time, and mobile media devices jumped up to 35%.

Race, socioeconomic class, and screen time 
Research has shown that race and socioeconomic class are associated with overall screen time. Younger demographics and individuals who self-identified as Black and "Other" were associated with above average screen use. Additionally, Black and Latino Americans had longer screen times because of less access to desktop computer, which thus leads to more time on phones. In children, the divide is much larger. On average in 2011, White children spent 8.5 hours a day with digital media, and Black and Latino children spent about 13 hours a day on screens. Black and Latino children were also more likely to have TVs in their rooms, which contributed to their increased use of screen time.

The discrepancy in the amount of screen time can also be attributed to a difference in income. In more affluent private schools, there has been a larger push to remove screens from education in order to limit the negative impacts that have been found from screen time. However, in public schools there is more push for the use of technology with some public schools advertising free iPads and laptops to students. Additionally, affluent families are able to afford nannies and extracurriculars that can limit the need for entertainment from screens.

Coronavirus and screen time 
The COVID-19 pandemic increased screen time as people stayed indoors, adding to concerns about the effects of excessive screen time. Specialists called for limiting screen time and for living a more active lifestyle.

Physical health effects

Sleep 
More screen-time has been linked with shorter sleep duration, decreased sleep efficiency, and longer sleep onset delay. When using any screen before bedtime, the blue light emitted disrupts the body's natural melatonin hormone production. Melatonin is produced by the brain's pineal gland and controls the body's internal clock.  This clock is what is referred to as the body's circadian rhythm and it naturally is responsive to light. Melatonin levels increase as the sun sets and remain at that increased state for the remainder of the night. As the sun rises, melatonin levels start to drop. This hormone reduction is what helps the body's natural rhythm wake up due to the bursts of natural sunlight. The light screens emit are in a similar spectrum of sunlight, but the blue light emission is what human circadian rhythms are most sensitive to. Studies have shown that the blue wavelengths are closely correlated to those from sunlight, which is what helps the body keep in sync with the sunrise and sunset. Therefore, using any screen prior to bedtime disrupts the body's production of natural bedtime hormones which can trick the brain to believe it is still daytime making it harder to fall asleep.

Increased use of screens in children has also been shown to have an association with adverse effects on the quality of sleep in children. A 2010 review concluded that "the use of electronic media by children and adolescents does have a negative impact on their sleep, although the precise effects and mechanisms remain unclear", with the most consistent results associating excessive media use with shorter sleep duration and delayed bed times. A 2016 meta-analysis found that "Bedtime access and use of media devices was significantly associated with inadequate sleep quantity; poor sleep quality; and excessive daytime sleepiness". This relationship is because much of the time spent on screens for children is at night, which can cause them to go to sleep later in addition to the blue light from the screens making it more difficult to sleep.

Night-time use of screens is common for Americans ages 12–18: A 2018 nationally representative survey found that 70% use their mobile device within 30 minutes of going to sleep. Data suggests those who had spent more time on their screens were more likely to wake in the night from notifications on their phone, or experience disruptive sleep. In a series of nationally representative surveys, 36% of Americans age 12-18 and 35% of Mexican teens age 13-18 woke up during the night before to check their mobile device. For American children and teens, 54% of those did so because of getting a notification and 51% did so because of the desire to check social media. Content that stirs emotions has been linked with a delay in the onset of sleep.

Many apps promise to improve sleep by filtering out blue light produced by media devices; there have been no large studies to assess whether such apps work. Some users express dissatisfaction with the resultant orange tint of screens. Some people use blue-blocking glasses, for the purpose of attempting to block out blue light both from electronic media and from other artificial light sources. The American Academy of Pediatrics recommends screen time for children be limited for multiple reasons, among them that "Too much screen time can also harm the amount and quality of sleep".

Effects on physical health
As well as negatively impacting the adult sleep cycle, using screens can also affect one's physical health. Obesity is a common result of spending great amounts of time on screens like a television, video games, a smartphone, or a computer screen. Studies have shown that if the amount of screen time adolescents spend was limited, the likelihood of obesity can be reduced.

This sedentary behavior is largely due to the nature of most electronic activities. Sitting to watch television, playing computer games or surfing the Internet takes time away from physical activities which leads to an increased risk of weight gain. It has been found that children (kindergarten and 1st graders) who watch 1–2 hours of television a day are more likely to be overweight or obese than children who watch less than one hour a day. Additionally, one study showed that the increased use of video games and other forms of media consumption led to more back pain among Norwegian teens.

It has been reported that screen time negatively affects health in children independently of their physical activity and eating habits. One possible explanation for the link between TV and obesity is the number of commercials for sugary and unhealthy foods. This advertising can have an effect on what gets purchased and consumed in a household. The effect of advertising was demonstrated in a study where children were shown cartoons with and without food commercials. The children who watched the food commercials along with the cartoons ate 45% more unhealthy snacks than the group who watched the cartoons without food ads.

Mental health effects 

As previously discussed, sleep and screen time are heavily impacted by the other and can lead to affecting one's behavior as well. If someone does not get an adequate amount of sleep, it can affect their behavior and performance for the day. High amounts of screen time also can significantly affect a person's mental health, although some have called these findings into question. With screen usage increasing as time progresses, adults have begun spending more and more time focusing their attention of screens. This time spent sitting and viewing a screen has been linked to mental health effects such as anxiety and depression. Adults who spend six hours or greater using screen time are more likely to suffer from moderate to severe depression. This increased use in screen time has been shown to be directly correlated with an increased chance of depression in adults. With this added risk, lack of sleep plays a major role in a healthy mindset, and without proper rest, mental health can degrade at a higher rate.

Brain development 
An increase in screen time has been associated with negative cognitive outcomes for children between 0 and 4. A study on Korean children aged 24–30 months old found that toddlers with 3 hours of TV viewing per day were three times as likely to experience a language delay. Toddlers with higher TV time also scored lower on school readiness tests, which measured vocabulary, number knowledge, and classroom engagement. The same outcomes are not present in children older than 4. Children who watched more TV were found to have less brain connectivity between language, visual and cognitive control regions of the brain than their peers who watched less TV.

An ongoing study reported from the National Institutes of Health concluded that preteens who spent over 7 hours on screens a day and children who spend less than 7 hours a day had noticeably different development of their cerebral cortex. This part of the brain usually thins as people mature but the accelerated decrease could potentially be linked to amounts spent on screens.

The American Academy of Pediatrics recommend for children in age 3 - 5, a screen time not longer than 1 hour per day. According to study published in November 2019, children who have a longer screen time, have slower brain development, what hurt "skills like imagery, mental control and self-regulation". The scientists add that: "This is important because the brain is developing the most rapidly in the first five years," "That's when brains are very plastic and soaking up everything, forming these strong connections that last for life." They also stated that screens changed childhood rapidly. The over exposure also hurts skills of literacy, cognition and language.

Behavioral impact 
Screen use has been implicated with a slew of behavioral effects, especially in children. The primary effect is an increase in sedentary activity. Approximately 47% of American children spend 2 or more hours per day on screen-based sedentary activities. This is in contrast with the 25.5% who reported at least 20 minutes of physical activity per day for a week. Additionally, the likelihood of a child participating in physical activity has been shown to decrease with increasing screen use. 
 Screen use can also affect interpersonal skills. UCLA researchers reported that sixth-graders who went five days without screen use were significantly better at reading human emotions than sixth-graders with average screen use.
Lindsay Kneteman says technology makes kids more aggressive and that it is more difficult to take kids off of electronic devices without having to argue and fight. She argues that screen time releases dopamine, a type of neurotransmitter that is associated with pleasure, which makes it harder for people to get off of their electronic devices. This means that when they stop using their electronic devices, the process of releasing dopamine stops as well, and for some people, this can cause irritability.

Academic performance 
Academic performance can be improved by screen time depending on the length and content of exposure. Toddlers after the age of 18 months can be exposed to high-quality programming such as Sesame Street or PBS that provide educational television. The right content can prove beneficial, but too much screen time distracts students from studying. It is important for parents to establish a limit to how much screen time their children can use per day. Limiting and monitoring children's screen usage can increase cognitive development, but further research is required to get a better understanding of how screen time positively affects academic performance. On the other hand, increased screen use has been associated with missing school assignments. Students who used screens for more than two hours a day are twice as likely to not turn in homework on a regular basis. It is yet to be proven that screen time can significantly enhance academic performance, but it is known that increased use in screen time distracts students from focusing on class assignments.

Environmental effects 
More screen time generally leads to less time spent in nature and therefore a weaker connection to it. Studies show nature-inspired activities simultaneously decrease for youth in financially stabilized countries with mental health issues increasing, drawing a connection to higher screen time levels. However, the higher the count in activities spent experiencing the outdoors produced positive results in mental health among adolescents.

Digital technologies emitted approximately 4% of world greenhouse-gas emissions in the year 2019 and the number could be two times larger by the year 2025. For comparison, the paper pulp and print industries emitted together about 1% in 2010 and about 0.9% in 2012.

Limitations on screen time

Adults 
There is no consensus on the safe amount of screen time for adults. Ideally, adults should limit their screen time similar to children and only use screens for about two hours a day. However, many adults spend up to 11 hours a day looking at a screen. Adults many times work jobs that require viewing screens which leads to the high screen time usage. Adults obligated to view screens for a means of work may not be able to use screen time less than two hours, but there are other recommendations that help mitigate negative health effects. For example, breaking up continuous blocks of screen time usage by stretching, maintaining good posture, and intermittently focusing on a distant object for 20 seconds. Furthermore, to mitigate the behavioral effects, adults are encouraged not to eat in front of a screen to avoid habit formation and to keep track of their screen use every day. Specialists also recommend that adults analyze their daily screen time usage and replace some of the unnecessary usage with a physical activity or social event.

Children 
In 2019, the World Health Organization came out with guidelines about media use for children under 5:

 Birth to age 1: No sedentary screen time
 Ages 2–4 No more than 60 minutes of sedentary screen time

More extensive guidelines have been put forth by the American Academy of Pediatrics (AAP) in 2016 for children up to age 5, which include screen time, the quality of content used, and how parents are using screens with their children. The screen time limits are as follows:

 Birth up to 18–24 months: No screen time (with the exception of video chatting)
 18–24 months: Limit screen time as much as possible
 Ages 2–5: Limit screen time to about an hour a day

In addition to these screen time guidelines, the AAP recommends that when screen time does occur, the content should be high-quality, educational, slower-paced, and free of violence. Caregivers should avoid giving apps to children that have highly distracting content.

They also recommend that families try to use media with their child so that they can help explain what content is on the screen and how it applies to their own lives. They recommend to turn off devices (including TVs) when the child is not actively using them and to keep bedrooms as screen-free zones. Additionally, they recommend that screens should be put away at least 1 hour before bedtime.

For children from ages 5 to 18, the AAP came out with recommendations in 2016 that focus less on the amount of screen time and more on how media is being used. They recommend children and teens should keep devices (including TVs) out of the bedroom during bedtime, and screens should be put away at least 1 hour before bedtime. They recommend that caregivers discourage children and teens to use screens during homework for entertainment purposes. Additionally, they recommend that families come up with a "Family Use Plan" that aligns with their family's needs, values, and goals. This plan should have consistent guidelines and limits for each family member, and families should consider having designated times of the day and areas in the house that are screen-free.

See also
 Dark therapy
 Delayed sleep phase disorder
 f.lux
 Light effects on circadian rhythm
 Night Shift (software)
 Red Moon (software)
 Digital media use and mental health
 Evolutionary psychiatry
 Gaming disorder
 Problematic smartphone use
 Social aspects of television

References

Further reading
 

Digital media use and mental health
Lifestyles
Obesity
Medical terminology